Daba is a town under the administration of Bobai County, Guangxi, China. , it administers Daba Residential Neighborhood and the following six villages:
Qingshan Village
Guanling Village
Dayi Village
Zhuling Village
Jiufu Village
Nalei Village

References 

Towns of Guangxi
Bobai County